This is a list of the women who were queens or empresses as wives of French monarchs from the 843 Treaty of Verdun, which gave rise to West Francia, until 1870, when the Third Republic was declared.

Living wives of reigning monarchs technically became queen consorts, including Margaret of Burgundy and Blanche of Burgundy who were kept in prison during their whole queenships.

Carolingian dynasty

Capetian dynasty

Direct Capetians

House of Valois

House of Lancaster 
Some sources refer to Margaret of Anjou as Queen of France, but her right to enjoy that title is disputed. She was briefly recognized only in English-controlled territories of France. (See also: Dual monarchy of England and France)

Capetian dynasty

House of Valois

House of Valois-Orléans

House of Valois-Angoulême

House of Bourbon 

Françoise d'Aubigné, Marquise de Maintenon, who secretly married Louis XIV in 1683, was never publicly acknowledged as his wife.

Bonaparte dynasty

Capetian dynasty

House of Bourbon

House of Orléans

Bonaparte dynasty

See also
Family tree of French monarchs
 List of French monarchs

References

Further reading
 Joy Law, Fleur de lys: The kings and queens of France. 
 Rene de La Croix, duc de Castries, The Lives of the Kings & Queens of France. 
 Elsie Thornton-Cook, Royal Line of France: The Story of the Kings and Queens of France. 

Consorts
Lists of queens
France